Ruben Gonzales (born September 11, 1985) is a Filipino professional tennis player playing on the ATP Challenger Tour. On May 6, 2013, he reached his highest ATP singles ranking of 766 and his highest doubles ranking of 122 achieved on August 29, 2022.

Tour titles

Doubles

External links
 
 
 

1985 births
Living people
Sportspeople from Terre Haute, Indiana
Tennis people from Indiana
Filipino male tennis players
Illinois Fighting Illini men's tennis players
Asian Games competitors for the Philippines
Tennis players at the 2014 Asian Games
Tennis players at the 2010 Asian Games
Southeast Asian Games silver medalists for the Philippines
Southeast Asian Games bronze medalists for the Philippines
Southeast Asian Games medalists in tennis
Competitors at the 2017 Southeast Asian Games
Competitors at the 2015 Southeast Asian Games
Competitors at the 2019 Southeast Asian Games
Competitors at the 2021 Southeast Asian Games
Citizens of the Philippines through descent
Southeast Asian Games gold medalists for the Philippines